Dasht-e Kenar may refer to:
 Dasht-e Kenar, Fars
 Dasht-e Kenar, Darab, Fars Province
 Dasht-e Kenar, Hormozgan